This is a list of districts of England showing their ethnic composition as recorded in the 2021 census.

Census respondents were asked "What is your ethnic group? Choose ONE section from A to E, then tick the appropriate box to indicate your cultural background." The sections offered were:
 A White (Backgrounds offered were: White British (including English); White Irish; White Gypsy or Irish Traveller; White Roma; Any other White background)
 B Mixed (White and Black Caribbean; White and Black African; White and Asian; Any other Mixed background)
 C Asian or Asian British (Indian; Pakistani; Bangladeshi; Chinese; Any other Asian background)
 D Black or Black British (Caribbean; African; Any other Black background)
 E Arab or other ethnic group (Arab, Any other)

See also List of English districts by population - List of English districts by area.

References 

Districts by ethnic diversity
Demographics of England
Districts of England